Svavarsson is a surname of Icelandic origin, meaning son of Svavar. In Icelandic names, the name is not strictly a surname, but a patronymic. The name may refer to:

Gardar Svavarsson (fl. 9th century), Swedish man, said to be the first Scandinavian to live in Iceland
Jörundur Svavarsson (contemporary), Icelandic professor of biology at the University of Iceland
Vignir Svavarsson (born 1980), Icelandic handball player
Ómar Svavarsson (contemporary), CEO of Vodafone Iceland

Icelandic-language surnames